The Solway Firth is a firth that forms part of the border between England and Scotland, between Cumbria (including the Solway Plain) and Dumfries and Galloway. It stretches from St Bees Head, just south of Whitehaven in Cumbria, to the Mull of Galloway, on the western end of Dumfries and Galloway. The Isle of Man is also very near to the firth. The firth comprises part of the Irish Sea.

The firth's coastline is characterised by lowland hills and small mountains. It is a mainly rural area, with mostly small villages and settlements (such as Powfoot). Fishing, hill farming, and some arable farming play a large part in the local economy, although tourism is increasing.

The northern part of the English coast of the Solway Firth was designated as an Area of Outstanding Natural Beauty, known as the Solway Coast, in 1964. Construction of the Robin Rigg Wind Farm in the firth began in 2007.

Within the firth, there are some salt flats and mud flats that can be dangerous, due to their frequently shifting patches of quicksand.

Wildlife
On the Cumbrian side, much of the coastline has been designated an Area of Outstanding Natural Beauty (AONB). The Solway Coast’s AONB has two separate sections: the first runs westward from just north of Carlisle to Skinburness; the second runs south from the hamlet of Beckfoot, past Mawbray and Allonby, to Crosscanonby.

In 2013, the honeycomb worm and blue mussel were designated as targets of conservation efforts, and Allonby Bay (an inlet of the Solway Firth) was put forward as a candidate for a Marine Conservation Zone.

Long-distance walking route

Islands in the Solway
Unlike other parts of the west coast of Scotland, the Solway Firth has only a few islands. They are:
 Hestan Island
 Rough Island
 Little Ross
 The so-called Isle of Whithorn (which is actually a peninsula).
The Islands of Fleet

Rivers 
The Solway Firth is the estuary of the River Eden and the River Esk.

Below are links to lists of the other rivers that flow into the firth:
in England
in Scotland

History

The name 'Solway' (recorded as Sulewad in 1218) is of Scandinavian origin, and was originally the name of a ford across the mud flats at Eskmouth. This may be due to the shortening of an originally long vowel in the Middle English period but may also represent an original short vowel.

The second element of the name is from the Old Norse , meaning 'ford' (which is cognate with the modern English word wade).

The area had three fords: the Annan or Bowness Wath, the Dornock Wath (once called the Sandywathe), and the main one —the Solewath (also called the Solewath or the Sulewad).

A wooden lighthouse was built in 1841 at Barnkirk Point. It was destroyed by fire in 1960.

On 9 March 1876, a 79-ton French Lugger, the St. Pierre, was stranded - and finally declared lost - on Blackshaw Bank, an ill-defined feature which extends for a considerable distance on both sides of the channel of the River Nith.

Between 1869 and 1921, the estuary was crossed by the Solway Junction Railway on a 1780 m (5850 ft) iron viaduct. The line was built to carry iron ore from the Whitehaven area to Lanarkshire and was financed and operated by the Caledonian Railway of Scotland. After the railway, which was not a financial success, ceased operating in 1921, the railway bridge became a popular footpath, enabling residents of Scotland to easily cross into England, where alcoholic drink was legally available seven days a week. (Scotland was dry on Sundays at the time.) The viaduct was demolished between 1931 and 1933.

Hazards
The Ministry of Defence had by 1999 fired more than 6,350 depleted uranium rounds into the Solway Firth from its testing range at Dundrennan Range.

In popular culture
 The Solway Firth has been used as the location for films. For example, the 1973 film  The Wicker Man was filmed around Kirkcudbright and Burrow Head on the Wigtownshire coast.
 In July 2019, the American metal band Slipknot released a song called  “Solway Firth” that is named after the firth.

See also

Anglo-Scottish border
Solway Plain
Wildfowl and Wetlands Trust
Solway Firth Spaceman

References

Slipknot 2019 song. "Solway Firth" from the Album "We Are Not Your Kind"

Further reading
  (available at )
 Ordnance Survey, (2003), Carlisle & Solway Firth, Landranger Map, No. 85, Ed.D., Scale 1:50 000 (1¼  inches to 1 mile),  
 Ordnance Survey, (2006), Solway Firth, Explorer Map, No. 314, Ed. A2, Scale 1:25 000 (2½  inches to 1 mile),

External links
Solway Shore Stories
The Powfoot Spa

 
Landforms of Dumfries and Galloway
Landforms of Cumbria
Firths of Scotland
Estuaries of England
Estuaries of Scotland
Bodies of water of the Irish Sea
Special Areas of Conservation in England
Special Areas of Conservation in Scotland
Anglo-Scottish border
Protected areas of Cumbria
Protected areas of Dumfries and Galloway
Natural regions of England